Dr. Adnan Shihab-Eldin (born 1 November 1943), former Acting Secretary General and Director of the Research Division of the Organization of the Petroleum Exporting Countries (OPEC) and former  Director General of the Kuwait Foundation for the Advancement of Sciences 2011-2021. He is also a research associate at the Oxford Institute for Energy Studies (OIES) since 2008 and a member of the board of directors of the SBC Energy Institute. 
Dr. Shihab-Eldin currently teaches in the MBA Energy Management at the Vienna University of Economics and Business (WU) and is a member of the advisory board for this program.

Biography
Dr. Shihab-Eldin studied electrical engineering at the University of California, Berkeley and received the degree of Bachelor of Science in 1965. Later on he focused on nuclear engineering and was awarded a M.Sc. degree in 1967 and a Ph.D. degree in 1970, respectively. Dr. Shihab-Eldin is a Phi Beta Kappa graduate.

He started his career at the Kuwait National Petroleum Company (KNPC). Later on he held teaching and research positions at Kuwait University, the Lawrence Berkeley Laboratory, the University of California, Berkeley, the European Organization for Nuclear Research (CERN) and Harvard University amongst others.

Dr. Shihab-Eldin also has a long career in administration and held senior management positions at national institutions and international organizations, including: Vice-Rector for academic affairs of Kuwait University, Director General of the Kuwait Institute of Scientific Research, Director of the UNESCO Cairo Office (Regional Office for Science and Technology for the Arab States), Director of the Division for Africa, Asia & Far East of the International Atomic Energy Agency (IAEA) and Director of the Research Division of the Organization of the Petroleum Exporting Countries (OPEC), where he served as Acting Secretary General in 2005.

Dr. Shihab-Eldin is a member of many national, regional and international scientific and professional societies; he has also served as a member of the board of directors of many companies and foundations as well as numerous advisory committees, including most recently the International Advisory Committee of the King Abdullah Petroleum Studies and Research Center in Riyadh, Saudi Arabia, the International Advisory Panel on Energy to the Singapore Ministry of Trade and Industry and the  Ambrosetti Forum’s International Advisory Council.

Dr. Shihab-Eldin has published extensively, including research papers in refereed journals, articles and reports; he has also authored or contributed to chapters to several books (see link below for a detailed list of publications), as well as invited talks at international and regional meetings. His publications are covering many fields, including Energy Policy, Economics and Technology; the Environment, Oil Markets; Renewable and Nuclear Power, Management and Development of Science & Technology in Developing Countries; Higher Education Systems, and other related fields.

Dr. Shihab-Eldin received many prestigious awards, most recently "The 2nd Abdullah Bin-Hamad Al-Attiyah International Energy Award - Lifetime Achievement" for the Advancement of the Organization of the Petroleum Exporting Countries.

References

External links 
 KFAS official site
 OPEC official site
Publication List of Dr. Adnan Shihab-Eldin

Living people
Kuwaiti engineers
Kuwaiti scientists
Secretaries General of OPEC
1943 births
UC Berkeley College of Engineering alumni